This is a list of Canadian films which were released in 1983:

See also
 1983 in Canada
 1983 in Canadian television

1983
1983 in Canadian cinema
Canada